Diagnosis: Murder seventh season originally aired from September 23, 1999, to May 11, 2000. The season was released on DVD complete and available in two parts by Visual Entertainment, Inc.

Cast
Dick Van Dyke as Dr. Mark Sloan
Victoria Rowell as Dr. Amanda Bentley
Charlie Schlatter as Dr. Jesse Travis
Barry Van Dyke as Steve Sloan

Episodes

References

Diagnosis: Murder seasons
1999 American television seasons
2000 American television seasons